Ahmed Khalifa (born March 23, 1985) is an Egyptian football player who plays as a midfielder for the Egyptian team El-Olympi. He was a member of Egyptian U-21 youth team, participating in 2005 FIFA World Youth Championship held in Netherlands.

Honours

National team
 Gold Medalist at Qatar U23 International Tournament 2007.
 Silver Medalist at CAF Youth African Cup 2005.
 U20 World Cup 2005 - Netherlands

Ismaily SC
 Egyptian Premier League: Runner-up 2007-2008, 2008-2009
 Arab Champions League: Q-Final 2008-2009

References

1985 births
Living people
Egyptian footballers
Ismaily SC players
Egyptian Premier League players
Association football midfielders